Baylor College is the former name of Baylor University, in Waco, Texas, United States.

Baylor College may also refer to:

 Baylor College of Medicine, in Houston, Texas
 Baylor College of Medicine Academy at Ryan, a middle school in Houston, Texas
 Texas A&M University Baylor College of Dentistry, in Dallas, Texas